The third encirclement campaign against the Honghu Soviet was an encirclement campaign launched by the Chinese Nationalist Government that was intended to destroy the communist Honghu Soviet and its Chinese Red Army in the local region.  It was responded by the Communists'  third counter-encirclement campaign at Honghu Soviet, also called by the communists as the third counter-encirclement campaign at Honghu Revolutionary Base, in which the local Chinese Red Army successfully defended their soviet republic in the southern Hubei and northern Hunan provinces against the Nationalist attacks from early September 1931 to 30 May 1932.

See also
List of battles of the Chinese Civil War
National Revolutionary Army
History of the People's Liberation Army
Chinese Civil War

References
Military History Research Department, Complete History of the People's Liberation Army, Military Science Publishing House in Beijing, 2000, 

Campaigns of the Chinese Civil War
1931 in China
1932 in China